The 1979 Alitalia Florence Open was a men's tennis tournament played on outdoor clay courts in Florence, Italy that was part of the 1979 Colgate-Palmolive Grand Prix circuit. It was the seventh edition of the tournament and was played from 14 May until 20 May 1979. Second-seeded Raúl Ramírez won the singles title.

Finals

Singles
 Raúl Ramírez defeated  Karl Meiler 6–4, 1–6, 3–6, 7–5, 6–0
 It was Ramírez' 1st singles title of the year and the 15th of his career.

Doubles
 Paolo Bertolucci /  Adriano Panatta defeated  Ivan Lendl /  Pavel Složil 6–4, 6–3

References

External links
 ITF tournament edition details

Alitalia Florence Open
Alitalia Florence Open
ATP Florence